Albertina Natalie "Tina" Noyes (born January 7, 1949) is an American former figure skater. She is a four-time U.S. national silver medalist and the 1967 North American bronze medalist. She represented the United States at the 1964 Winter Olympics, where she placed 8th, and at the 1968 Winter Olympics, where she placed 4th. She was coached by Cecilia Colledge.

Noyes coaches at the Hayden Recreation Centre in Lexington, Massachusetts. In 2017, she received the Dorothy Franey Langkop Ambassador Award from the U.S. Olympians and Paralympians Association.

She is married to Larry Zimmerman.

Results

References

1949 births
Living people
American female single skaters
Olympic figure skaters of the United States
Figure skaters at the 1964 Winter Olympics
Figure skaters at the 1968 Winter Olympics
Sportspeople from Cambridge, Massachusetts
21st-century American women